Pelochyta cinerea is a moth of the family Erebidae. It was described by Francis Walker in 1855. It is found in Costa Rica, Panama, Colombia, Venezuela, Ecuador, Bolivia and Brazil.

References

Pelochyta
Moths described in 1855